Internati, officially is known as Giorgi Chkondideli District, is a suburb of Rustavi, south-eastern Georgia, which is situated in the eastern part of the city and is separated from the rest of town by the Tbilisi-Baku railway track. The name Internati (Internatebi) comes from the short form of the word "International", used because diverse ethnic groups live there alongside Georgians. In spite of the popularity, it is not used as the official name.

See also
Rustavi
 Kvemo Kartli

References 

Populated places in Kvemo Kartli
Rustavi